Web of the Spider is a 1971 horror film directed by Antonio Margheriti. 
The film is about the writer Alan Foster (Anthony Franciosa) who accepts a bet from Edgar Allan Poe (Klaus Kinski) and his friend Thomas Blackwood (Enrico Osterman) to stay a night in Blackwood's castle. At the castle, Foster meets Blackwood's sister Elisabeth (Michèle Mercier) and Julia (Karin Field). Foster has sex with Elisabeth and wakes up to find that she was stabbed by someone whose body vanishes, allowing Foster to realize the house is possessed by ghosts.

Web of the Spider is a color remake of Margheriti's earlier film Castle of Blood.

Plot
The film is narrated by a troubled Edgar Allan Poe (Klaus Kinski). It begins with Poe's attempts to confirm a ghost story by examining the ghosts' tombs. However, he doesn't go too far to avoid being haunted and killed. Later, a journalist named Alan Foster (Anthony Franciosa) visits Poe to drive him out of madness, but he is forced to challenge the horror writer on the authenticity of his stories.

This leads to Foster's accepting a bet from Lord Blackwood to spend the night in a haunted castle on All Soul's Eve. Foster is surprised by ghosts who appear to be half-humans, in very effective and horrifying special effects. Ghosts of the murdered inhabitants appear to him throughout the night, re-enacting the events that led to their respective deaths and driving Foster to madness. He meets the following ghosts: Elisabeth Blackwood (Michèle Mercier), who falls in love with Foster; the annoying and easy-to-hate Julia (Karin Field); the rough criminal William Perkins (Silvano Tranquilli); and the most despicable one of all, Dr. Carmus (Peter Carsten). Near the end of the film, the ghosts reveal their true nature: they aren't actually ghosts, but vampires with ghostly powers, and they need Foster's blood to maintain their existence. Because she loves him, Elisabeth tries to save Foster by aiding his escape. He succeeds in escaping the castle, but not the garden. Distracted and careless, he pushes the door so hard that the metal spikes impale him on the main gate.

Cast
 Anthony Franciosa as Alan Foster
 Michèle Mercier as Elisabeth Blackwood
 Klaus Kinski as Edgar Allan Poe
 Peter Carsten as Dr. Carmus
 Silvano Tranquilli as William Perkins
 Karin Field as Julia
 Raf Baldassarre as Herbert
 Irina Maleeva as Elsie Perkins
 Enrico Osterman as Lord Thomas Blackwood
 Marco Bonetti as Maurice

Production
The film was produced by Giovanni Di Addessi, with a story credited to Bruno Corbucci and Giovanni Grimaldi and score by Riz Ortolani.

After Castle of Blood'''s disappointing box office, Margheriti felt he could remake the film as Web of the Spider in colour in 1970. Margheriti would later comment that it was "stupid to remake it" and that "the color cinematography destroyed everything: the atmosphere, the tension."

ReleaseWeb of the Spider was released in Italy on 26 August 1971 where it was distributed by Panta Cinematografica. The film grossed a total of 232,442,000 Italian lire on its domestic release. It received a release in West Germany as Dracula im Schloß des Schreckens on 16 March 1972. It was released later in France on 8 February 1978 as Les fantômes de Hurlevent''.

References

Footnotes

Sources

External links
 

1971 films
1971 horror films
Italian horror films
German horror films
French horror films
West German films
1970s Italian-language films
Horror film remakes
Remakes of Italian films
Films directed by Antonio Margheriti
Films scored by Riz Ortolani
Works about Edgar Allan Poe
Films set in castles
Cultural depictions of Edgar Allan Poe
Films set in the 1840s
1970s Italian films
1970s French films
1970s German films